A constitutional referendum was held in Lithuania on 10 November 1996 alongside the second round of the parliamentary elections. Voters were asked whether they approved of an amendment to Article 47 of the constitution to add a paragraph allowing EU citizens to buy agricultural land. Although it was approved by 52% of those voting, voter turnout was only 39.7% and the referendum failed to pass the threshold of 50% of registered voters in favour.

Results

References

1996 referendums
1996 in Lithuania
Referendums in Lithuania
Constitutional referendums